The Bulletin of the History of Archaeology is an open access, peer-reviewed academic journal publishing research, reviews, and short communications on the history of archaeology. It was established in May 1991 by Douglas Givens. It was edited for many years by Tim Murray, and since 2015 it has been edited by Gabriel Moshenska.

References

External links 
 

Archaeology journals
Publications established in 1991
English-language journals
Biannual journals
Ubiquity Press academic journals